William Litterer (1834–1917) was an American Democratic politician. He served as the Mayor of Nashville, Tennessee from 1890 to 1891.

Early life
Litterer was born in Germany on August 24, 1834. His father, Charles A. Litterer, taught at Heidelberg University. His brother was Charles A. Litterer. They came to the United States in 1847 with their parents and settled in Nashville in 1855.

Career
Litterer worked as a maritime pilot on the Cumberland River.

Litterer became Mayor pro tem after Mayor Charles P. McCarver resigned in October 1890. On February 10, 1891 he was elected Mayor, to complete the unexpired term of McCarver. As a result, he served as Mayor from 1890 to 1891.

In 1915, Litterer purchased the building of the University of Nashville Medical Department called the Litterer Laboratory (on the National Register of Historic Places since January 9, 1978) and donated it to Vanderbilt University.

Death
Litterer died in December 1917. He is buried at Mount Olivet Cemetery in Nashville.

References

1834 births
1917 deaths
German emigrants to the United States
Tennessee Democrats
Mayors of Nashville, Tennessee
Vanderbilt University people
19th-century American politicians
Burials at Mount Olivet Cemetery (Nashville)
19th-century American businesspeople